Taylor High School may refer to:

 United Kingdom
Taylor High School (New Stevenston), Motherwell, Scotland
 United States
Alief Taylor High School, Harris County, Texas
Blair–Taylor High School, Blair, Wisconsin
James E. Taylor High School, Harris County, Texas
Lake Taylor High School, Norfolk, Virginia
Richardton–Taylor High School, Richardton, North Dakota
T. DeWitt Taylor Middle–High School, Pierson, Florida
Taylor Allderdice High School, Pittsburgh, Pennsylvania
Taylor County High School (Perry, Florida), Perry, Florida
Taylor County High School (Butler, Georgia), Butler, Georgia
Taylor County High School (Campbellsville, Kentucky), Campbellsville, Kentucky
Taylor High School (Arkansas), Taylor, Arkansas
Taylor High School (Kokomo, Indiana), Kokomo, Indiana
Taylor High School (North Bend, Ohio), North Bend, Ohio
Taylor High School (Taylor, Texas), Taylor, Texas
Taylor Manor School, Ellicott City, Maryland
Taylor High School (Michigan), Taylor, Michigan
Taylor Preparatory High School, Taylor, Michigan